Itpints is a search engine created by Pixelatom and launched in February 2009. Itpints gets results from sources such as social networks, newspapers, video and pictures sources. It can be used to follow what people are saying about a topic at the moment.

The sources ItPints uses for its search engine are: Twitter, Friendfeed, YouTube, Vimeo, Reddit, Flickr, Digg, Plurk, among others.

Technology
Itpints is based on LAMP platform and uses the open source framework called LinxPHP originally written by Javier Arias.

References 

Internet search engines
Real-time web